Boya may refer to:

Boya, Western Australia
Boya, Nepal
Boya people, an ethnic group in Sudan
Boyar caste, Boyar caste of India
Mireia Boya Busquet (born 1979), Spanish scientist and politician
Pierre Boya (born 1984), Cameroonian footballer
Yu Boya, ancient Chinese guqin player
Guangya, ancient Chinese book, also called Boya